Ramal do Pego is a railway branch in Portugal, which connects the station of Mouriscas-A, on the Linha da Beira Baixa, to the Pego Power Station.

See also 
 List of railway lines in Portugal
 History of rail transport in Portugal

References

Sources
 

Railway lines in Portugal
Iberian gauge railways